Menconi is a surname. Notable people with the surname include:

Anna Menconi (born 1971), Italian Paralympic archer
Arn Menconi (born 1959), American politician
Lorrie Menconi (born 1948), American model
Raffaele Menconi (1877–1942), Italian sculptor 
Ralph J. Menconi (1915–1972), American medal sculptor

Italian-language surnames